is a railway station in the city of Tochigi, Tochigi Prefecture, Japan, operated by the East Japan Railway Company (JR East).

Lines
Ōhirashita Station is served by the Ryōmō Line, and is located 15.2 km from the terminus of the line at Oyama Station.

Station layout
Ōhirashita Station consists of a single side platform serving traffic in both directions. The station is unattended.

History
It was renamed to its present name on 16 October 1918. The station was absorbed into the JR East network upon the privatization of the Japanese National Railways (JNR) on 1 April 1987. The layout of the station was reduced from two platforms serving three tracks to the present single platform/single track layout in 2001.

Passenger statistics
In fiscal 2011, the station was used by an average of 501 passengers daily (boarding passengers only).

Surrounding area
former Ōhira Town Hall
 Ōhira Post Office
 Ōhirashita Hospital

See also
 List of railway stations in Japan

References

External links

 JR East Station information 

Railway stations in Japan opened in 1895
Railway stations in Tochigi Prefecture
Ryōmō Line
Stations of East Japan Railway Company
Tochigi, Tochigi